VC10 or VC-10 may refer to:

Vickers VC10, a British jet airliner
VC-10 Challengers, a former United States Navy aircraft squadron
Korg VC-10, an analogue vocoder from the 1970s
Super VC-10 Hap, a species of fish
Commodore MAX Machine, a home computer
Akpeteshie, a Ghanaian spirit
Visual C++ 2010, the 2010 edition of Microsoft Visual C++, a software integrated development environment